San Marcos is a former monastery and hospital in the city of León, Spain.  It is now a parador, and includes a church and museum.

Buildings and structures in Castile and León
Renaissance architecture in León, Spain